Thymosin beta-4 is a protein that in humans is encoded by the TMSB4X gene. Recommended INN (International Nonproprietary Name) for thymosin beta-4 is 'timbetasin', as published by the World Health Organization (WHO).

The protein consists (in humans) of 43 amino acids (sequence: SDKPDMAEI EKFDKSKLKK TETQEKNPLP SKETIEQEKQ AGES) and has a molecular weight of 4921 g/mol.

Thymosin-β4 is a major cellular constituent in many tissues. Its intracellular concentration may reach as high as 0.5 mM. Following Thymosin α1, β4 was the second of the biologically active peptides from Thymosin Fraction 5 to be completely sequenced and synthesized.

Function 

This gene encodes an actin sequestering protein which plays a role in regulation of actin polymerization. The protein is also involved in cell proliferation, migration, and differentiation. This gene escapes X inactivation and has a homolog on chromosome Y (TMSB4Y).

Biological activities of thymosin β4 

Any concepts of the biological role of thymosin β4 must inevitably be coloured by the demonstration that total ablation of the thymosin β4 gene in the mouse allows apparently normal embryonic development of mice which are fertile as adults.

Actin binding 

Thymosin β4 was initially perceived as a thymic hormone. However this changed when it was discovered that it forms a 1:1 complex with G (globular) actin, and is present at high concentration in a wide range of mammalian cell types. When appropriate, G-actin monomers polymerize to form F (filamentous) actin, which, together with other proteins that bind to actin, comprise cellular microfilaments. Formation by G-actin of the complex with β-thymosin (= "sequestration") opposes this.

Due to its profusion in the cytosol and its ability to bind G-actin but not F-actin, thymosin β4 is regarded as the principal actin-sequestering protein in many cell types. Thymosin β4 functions like a buffer for monomeric actin as represented in the following reaction:

F-actin ↔ G-actin + Thymosin β4 ↔ G-actin/Thymosin β4

Release of G-actin monomers from thymosin β4 occurs as part of the mechanism that drives actin polymerization in the normal function of the cytoskeleton in cell morphology and cell motility.

The sequence LKKTET, which starts at residue 17 of the 43-aminoacid sequence of thymosin beta-4, and is strongly conserved between all β-thymosins, together with a similar sequence in WH2 domains, is frequently referred to as "the actin-binding motif" of these proteins, although modelling based on X-ray crystallography has shown that essentially the entire length of the β-thymosin sequence interacts with actin in the actin-thymosin complex.

"Moonlighting"

In addition to its intracellular role as the major actin-sequestering molecule in cells of many multicellular animals, thymosin β4 shows a remarkably diverse range of effects when present in the fluid surrounding animal tissue cells. Taken together, these effects suggest that thymosin has a general role in tissue regeneration. This has suggested a variety of possible therapeutic applications, and several have now been extended to animal models and human clinical trials.

It is considered unlikely that thymosin β4 exerts all these effects via intracellular sequestration of G-actin. This would require its uptake by cells, and moreover, in most cases the cells affected already have substantial intracellular concentrations.

The diverse activities related to tissue repair may depend on interactions with receptors quite distinct from actin and possessing extracellular ligand-binding domains. Such multi-tasking by, or "partner promiscuity" of, proteins has been referred to as protein moonlighting. Proteins such as thymosins which lack stable folded structure in aqueous solution, are known as intrinsically unstructured proteins (IUPs). Because IUPs acquire specific folded structures only on binding to their partner proteins, they offer special possibilities for interaction with multiple partners. A candidate extracellular receptor of high affinity for thymosin β4 is the β subunit of cell surface-located ATP synthase, which would allow extracellular thymosin to signal via a purinergic receptor.

Some of the multiple activities of thymosin β4 unrelated to actin may be mediated by a tetrapeptide enzymically cleaved from its N-terminus, N-acetyl-ser-asp-lys-pro, brand names Seraspenide or Goralatide, best known as an inhibitor of the proliferation of haematopoietic (blood-cell precursor) stem cells of bone marrow.

Tissue regeneration

Work with cell cultures and experiments with animals have shown that administration of thymosin β4 can promote migration of cells, formation of blood vessels, maturation of stem cells, survival of various cell types and lowering of the production of pro-inflammatory cytokines. These multiple properties have provided the impetus for a worldwide series of on-going clinical trials of potential effectiveness of thymosin β4 in promoting repair of wounds in skin, cornea and heart.

Such tissue-regenerating properties of thymosin β4 may ultimately contribute to repair of human heart muscle damaged by heart disease and heart attack. In mice, administration of thymosin β4 has been shown to stimulate formation of new heart muscle cells from otherwise inactive precursor cells present in the outer lining of adult hearts, to induce migration of these cells into heart muscle and recruit new blood vessels within the muscle.

Anti-inflammatory role for sulfoxide

In 1999 researchers in Glasgow University found that an oxidised derivative of thymosin β4 (the sulfoxide, in which an oxygen atom is added to the methionine near the N-terminus) exerted several potentially anti-inflammatory effects on neutrophil leucocytes. It promoted their dispersion from a focus, inhibited their response to a small peptide (F-Met-Leu-Phe) which attracts them to sites of bacterial infection and lowered their adhesion to endothelial cells. (Adhesion to endothelial cells of blood vessel walls is pre-requisite for these cells to leave the bloodstream and invade infected tissue). A possible anti-inflammatory role for the β4 sulfoxide was supported by the group's finding that it counteracted artificially-induced inflammation in mice.

The group had first identified the thymosin sulfoxide as an active factor in culture fluid of cells responding to treatment with a steroid hormone, suggesting that its formation might form part of the mechanism by which steroids exert anti-inflammatory effects. Extracellular thymosin β4 would be readily oxidised to the sulfoxide in vivo at sites of inflammation, by the respiratory burst.

Terminal deoxynucleotidyl transferase

Thymosin β4 induces the activity of the enzyme terminal deoxynucleotidyl transferase in populations of thymocytes (thymus-derived lymphocytes). This suggests that the peptide may contribute to the maturation of these cells.

Clinical significance 

Tβ4 has been studied in a number of clinical trials.

In phase 2 trials with patients having pressure ulcers, venous pressure ulcers, and epidermolysis bullosa, Tβ4 accelerated the rate of repair. It was also found to be safe and well tolerated.

In human clinical trials, Tβ4 improves the conditions of dry eye and neurotrophic keratopathy with effects lasting long after the end of treatment.

Doping in sports

Thymosin beta-4 is considered a performance enhancing substance and is banned in sports by the World Anti-Doping Agency due to its effect of aiding soft tissue recovery and enabling higher training loads. It was central to two controversies in Australia in the 2010s which saw a large proportion of the playing lists from two professional football clubs – the Cronulla-Sutherland Sharks of the National Rugby League and the Essendon Football Club of the Australian Football League – found guilty of doping and suspended from playing; in both cases, the players were administered thymosin beta-4 in a program organised by sports scientist Stephen Dank.

Interactions 

TMSB4X has been shown to interact with ACTA1 and ACTG1.

See also 
 Beta thymosins
 Thymosin beta-4, Y-chromosomal
 Thymosins

References

Further reading 

 
 
 
 
 
 
 
 
 
 
 
 
 
 
 
 
 
 

Peptides